is the 8th single by the Japanese girl idol group Berryz Kobo. It was released in Japan on August 3, 2005, and debuted at number 5 in the daily Oricon singles chart and at number 13 in the weekly Oricon singles chart.

It was the last single that featured Berryz Kobo member Maiha Ishimura.

Track listings

CD single 
 
 
 "21ji made no Cinderella" (Instrumental)

DVD single "21ji made no Cinderella" Single V 
 "21ji made no Cinderella"
 "21ji made no Cinderella" (Dance Shot Ver.)

Charts

References

External links 
 Profile on the Up-Front Works official website
 Profile of the corresponding DVD single on the Up-Front Works official website

2005 singles
2005 songs
Japanese-language songs
Berryz Kobo songs
Songs written by Tsunku
Piccolo Town singles
Song recordings produced by Tsunku